Cocorico was a French magazine first published in 1898. It was produced by the artist Paul-Émile Boutigny and featured many artists of the Art Nouveau movement including Alphonse Mucha and Théophile Steinlen. The magazine had 63 issues.

References

External links
A collection of Alphonse Mucha's work in Cocorico

1898 establishments in France
1902 disestablishments in France
Art Nouveau magazines
Defunct magazines published in France
French art publications
French-language magazines
Magazines established in 1898
Magazines disestablished in 1902